Garautha is a Tehsil and a Nagar Panchayat city in district of Jhansi, Uttar Pradesh. The Garautha City is divided into 10 wards for which elections are held every 5 years. Garautha is 80 and 36 km away from Jhansi and Tahrauli. There is also tehseel headquarter. There are some religious places near Garautha as Jharkhand dham,Hanuman mandir,lathator dham ashram.

Geography
It has an average elevation of 153 metres (501 feet). The city of Garautha is situated on the banks of Lakheri River.

Demographics
The Garautha Tehsil as per Census 2011 has a population of 233,688 of which 124,934 are males and 108,754 are females.

The Garautha Nagar Panchayat has population of 10,807 of which 5,682 are males while 5,125 are females as per report released by Census India 2011. Literacy rate of Garautha Nagar Panchayat is 80.67% higher than state average of 67.68%.

Education 
Education institute providing educations from elementary to graduate degrees are available and functioning in Garautha. The degree colleges at Garautha are affiliated to Bundelkhand University and Schools are affiliated to UP Board and CBSE Board.

Schools 

 Kanya Inter College, Garautha
 Kher Inter College, Gursarai
 Dr. Vijay Foundation School, Garautha
 Akhandanand Janta Inter College School, Garautha
 St. Mary's, Gursarai jhansi
Jay hind mishon inter college Garautha (Jhansi)
Goswami Tulsidas Vidyapeeth Inter College Erach(Jhansi)

Colleges 

 Motibai Rajaram Mahavidyalaya (MBR College)
 Dr Ram Manohar Lohiya Mahila Mahavidyalaya, Gursarai
 Bhagwati Industrial Training Institute (BITI)
 Seth Ramdas memorial mahavidyalay Erach

Politics 
Garautha is a Vidhan Sabha (Legislative Assembly) Constituency.

References 

Cities and towns in Jhansi district

Bundelkhand